Álex Sigurbjörnsson Benet (born December 13, 1988) is an Icelandic born-Spanish rower. He was born in Reykjavik (Iceland). He and Pau Vela placed 13th in the men's coxless pair event at the 2016 Summer Olympics.

See also 
 Ebro

References

External links 
 
 
 

1988 births
Living people
Spanish male rowers
Spanish people of Icelandic descent
Olympic rowers of Spain
Rowers at the 2016 Summer Olympics
Mediterranean Games bronze medalists for Spain
Mediterranean Games medalists in rowing
Competitors at the 2013 Mediterranean Games